The Center for  Research and Advanced Studies of the National Polytechnic Institute (in Spanish: Centro de Investigación y de Estudios Avanzados del Instituto Politécnico Nacional or simply as CINVESTAV-IPN) is a Mexican non-governmental scientific research institution affiliated with the National Polytechnic Institute and founded by president Adolfo López Mateos on 17 April 1961, initially planned as a postgraduate department of the National Polytechnic Institute; this was later modified by President José López Portillo, on 17 September 1982.

The modification by President Portillo stipulates that it is a decentralized organ of public interest, with legal personality and own patrimony. Cinvestav receives an annual subsidy by the Federal Government to fund its operations.

Organization

Campuses 

The institute is divided into 10 research centers; 3 of these are in Mexico City, while the others are dispersed across the country. They are located as follows:

Mexico City: Zacatenco, Coapa (south) and San Borja
Guadalajara, Jalisco
Irapuato, Guanajuato
Mérida, Yucatán
Querétaro, Querétaro
Saltillo, Coahuila
Monterrey, Nuevo León
Ciudad Victoria, Tamaulipas

Departments 

The institute is divided into 33 departments:

World ranking 
Cinvestav ranks 4th within research centers in Latin America and holds the position 118 in the world.

References

External links 

 Official website
 http://research.webometrics.info/en/Latin_America/Mexico

Educational institutions established in 1961
Instituto Politécnico Nacional
Research institutes in Mexico
Laboratories in Mexico
Postgraduate schools in Mexico
1961 establishments in Mexico